Napier City Rovers is a football team based in Napier, New Zealand,  competing in the Central Premier League.

Club history
The team was founded in 1973 via a merger of Napier Rovers and Napier City.

Napier City Rovers have won New Zealand's premier knockout football competition (the Chatham Cup) five times, in 1985, 1993, 2000, 2002, and 2019 won the old New Zealand National Soccer League in 1989, 1993, 1998, and 2000. They represented New Zealand at the Oceania Club Championship in 2001, finishing third.

The Hawke's Bay region, of which Napier is a part, were represented by Napier City Soccer in the first year of New Zealand's new Football Championship in the summer of 2004, the only region that was not represented by an amalgamated franchise. That changed the following year with the change of name also to Hawke's Bay United. As with all teams making up the new franchises, they continue to compete in local winter football leagues, and also in the Chatham Cup.

Current squad
''Squad for the 2020 Central Premier League

Staff
Head Coach:  Bill Robertson

Honours

New Zealand National Soccer League
Champions (4): 1989, 1993, 1998, 2000.

Chatham Cup
Champions (5): 1985, 1993, 2000, 2002, 2019

Central Premier League
Champions (3): 2012, 2015, 2018.

Performance in OFC competitions
Oceania Club Championship (1 appearance)
 2000–01 – 3rd Place – Won against AS Vénus  3 – 2 (stage 4 of 4)

References

External links
 Official website
 Ultimate NZ Soccer page

Association football clubs in New Zealand
Association football clubs established in 1973
Sport in Napier, New Zealand
1973 establishments in New Zealand